Let the Sunshine In may refer to the following:

Albums
"Let the Sunshine In (album)", a 1969 album by Diana Ross and the Supremes

Songs
"Aquarius/Let the Sunshine In", a 1969 medley of two songs from the musical Hair recorded by The 5th Dimension

"Open Up Your Heart (And Let the Sunshine In)", a 1954 song by Stuart Hamblen, later covered by Pebbles & Bamm Bamm on an episode of The Flintstones in 1965
"Let the Sunshine In", a 2001 single by Army of Lovers

Film
 Let the Sunshine In (film), a 2017 film by director Claire Denis based on A Lover's Discourse: Fragments

See also
 "Let the Sun Shine", a 2010 single by